Marius Bourrelly (1820–1896) was a French poet and playwright who wrote in Provençal.

Early life
Marius Bourrelly was born in 1820 in Aix-en-Provence, France.

Career
Bourrelly wrote many poems, plays, legends and songs in Provençal. In a poem, he praised Emperor Napoleon for visiting Lyon shortly after the flood of 1856. He became a member of the Félibrige.

Death and legacy
Bourrelly died in 1896. He bequeathed his personal library to the Bibliothèque Méjanes.

Works

References

1820 births
1896 deaths
Writers from Aix-en-Provence
French male poets
19th-century French poets
Occitan-language poets
19th-century French dramatists and playwrights
19th-century French male writers